Rafael Sangiovani (born 31 March 1998) is an Argentine professional footballer who plays as a midfielder for Villa Dálmine, on loan from Rosario Central.

Career
Sangiovani is a product of the Rosario Central youth system. After signing his first professional contract in 2019, he was promoted into the first-team squad in late-2020 under manager Kily González. Sangiovani made his senior debut in a 1–1 draw away from home against Banfield on 4 December 2020, featuring for eighty minutes before being replaced by Diego Zabala due to injury. In January 2022, Sangiovani joined Primera Nacional club Villa Dálmine on a one-year loan deal.

Career statistics
.

Notes

References

External links

1998 births
Living people
People from Caseros Department
Argentine people of Italian descent
Argentine footballers
Association football midfielders
Argentine Primera División players
Primera Nacional players
Rosario Central footballers
Villa Dálmine footballers
Sportspeople from Santa Fe Province